Walter Spratt (14 April 1889 – 22 January 1945) was an English professional footballer who played as a full-back in the Football League for Manchester United and Brentford. Born in Birmingham, he began his career with Rotherham Town and made guest appearances for Clapton Orient during the First World War. After leaving Brentford in 1921, he played for Sittingbourne for a year, before ending his career with Elsecar Main.

Career

Early career

Born in Birmingham, Spratt began his career at Midland League club Rotherham Town in 1910, joining from local club Meadow Hall. A year later, he signed for Southern League First Division club Brentford and made more than 100 appearances for the club before departing Griffin Park in early 1915.

Manchester United
In February 1915, Spratt joined Football League First Division club Manchester United. He initially joined on a one-month trial after being released by Brentford (along with all their other professional players). Despite this, Brentford demanded Manchester United pay a fee to sign Spratt; United initially refused, but an Inter-League Board inquiry later ruled that they pay a fee of £175. He made his Football League debut on 6 February, playing at right-back in a 1–0 defeat to Sunderland. He made a total of 12 appearances during the 1914–15 season.

Due to the ongoing First World War, Spratt did not make another competitive appearance for the Red Devils again until the 1919–20 season. During the war, he played for Manchester United in the wartime leagues, as well as making guest appearances for Clapton Orient. He was injured while playing for Clapton Orient and was not discharged from hospital until September 1919. He made his comeback from injury in a Manchester United reserve team game in January 1920, before making final appearance for the club a month later in a 1–0 defeat at home to Arsenal on 28 February.

Return to Brentford 
Spratt returned to Brentford in May 1920, for the club's first season in the Third Division South. He made just four appearances, with his final game coming in a 2–0 defeat to West London rivals Queens Park Rangers on Christmas Day 1920. Spratt departed Brentford at the end of the 1920–21 season, having made 123 appearances and scored one goal during his two spells with Brentford.

Sittingbourne 
At the end of the 1920–21 season, Spratt moved to non-League club Sittingbourne and moved back to Yorkshire in 1922 to end his career with Elsecar Main.

Personal life 
In 1906, Spratt served in the Royal Navy aboard HMS Boscawen III. After the outbreak of the First World War, he joined the Royal Naval Reserve in February 1915 and later served in the Royal Naval Air Service (and subsequently the Royal Air Force) on communications bases at Crystal Palace and RNAS Kingsnorth. While working as a despatcher for Mosers, Spratt was one of 35 people killed in a V-2 rocket attack on Southwark, London, on 22 January 1945.

Career statistics

References

1889 births
English footballers
Footballers from Huddersfield
Brentford F.C. players
English Football League players
Association football fullbacks
1945 deaths
Southern Football League players
Manchester United F.C. players
Clapton Orient F.C. wartime guest players
Sittingbourne F.C. players
Royal Naval Volunteer Reserve personnel of World War I
British civilians killed in World War II
Rotherham Town F.C. (1899) players
Deaths by airstrike during World War II
Royal Naval Air Service personnel of World War I
Royal Air Force personnel of World War I
Royal Naval Reserve personnel